Perth Redbacks is an NBL1 West club based in Perth, Western Australia. The club fields a team in both the Men's and Women's NBL1 West. The club is a division of Perth Basketball Association (PBA), the major administrative basketball organisation in Perth's eastern suburbs and across the CBD. The Redbacks play their home games at Belmont Oasis Leisure Centre.

Club history

Background
Perth Basketball Association (PBA) was established in 1964 as Perth Basketball Club. Nicknamed the Demons in the 1970s, Perth competed in the Western Australian Basketball Federation's (WABF) District Competition. The association claimed men's premierships in 1965, 1970, 1972, 1973, 1976 and 1977, while the women's team won a premiership in 1975.

SBL / NBL1 West
1989 saw the formation of the State Basketball League (SBL) with both a men's and women's competition. Perth, trading as the Redbacks, entered a team into both the Men's SBL and Women's SBL. Both teams were successful in winning inaugural championships in 1989, with the men's team defending their title in 1990. Future NBA player Luc Longley was a member of the Redbacks' back-to-back championship squads.

In 1997, the men's team won their third championship. This was followed by the women's team winning their second championship in 2000. In 2017, the men's team ended the club's championship drought with a 103–70 win over the Joondalup Wolves in the grand final.

In 2021, the SBL was rebranded as NBL1 West.

Accolades
Women
Championships: 2 (1989, 2000)
Grand Final appearances: 4 (1989, 1991, 2000, 2001)
Minor premierships: Nil

Men
Championships: 4 (1989, 1990, 1997, 2017)
Grand Final appearances: 5 (1989, 1990, 1997, 1999, 2017)
Minor premierships: 1 (1997)

References

External links
PBA's official website
"New Perth Redbacks chief executive Ryan Lenegan on mission to find NBL1 club’s first permanent home" at perthnow.com.au

1989 establishments in Australia
Basketball teams established in 1989
Basketball teams in Western Australia
Sporting clubs in Perth, Western Australia
NBL1 West teams